Amityville: The Awakening is a 2017 American supernatural horror film written and directed by Franck Khalfoun and starring Bella Thorne, Jennifer Jason Leigh, Cameron Monaghan, Mckenna Grace, Thomas Mann, Taylor Spreitler, Jennifer Morrison, and Kurtwood Smith. It is the tenth installment of the Amityville film series and a direct sequel/metafilm taking place in the "real world" outside of the continuity of the series which establishes The Amityville Horror (1979), the sequels from 1982 to 1996, and the 2005 remake of the original film as fiction. Its plot follows a teenager who moves into 112 Ocean Avenue with her family, who shortly find themselves haunted by a demonic entity using her brain-dead twin brother's body as a vessel.

Filmed in 2014, the film suffered numerous release delays before finally being released for free on Google Play on October 12, 2017. It was released by RADiUS-TWC in a limited release on October 28. It is the last film to be released by distributor, as the company shut down along with Dimension and their parent company, The Weinstein Company, on July 16, 2018, following the sexual abuse allegations against its co-founder Harvey Weinstein.

Plot
Teenager Belle Walker moves to 112 Ocean Avenue in Amityville, Long Island with her mother Joan, younger sister Juliet, brain-dead twin brother, James, as well as her dog, Larry. The family's reason for moving there was to be closer to Dr. Milton, a neurologist hoping to treat James, who is on life support after an accident that left him paralyzed. Upon moving in, Juliet tells Belle that James has been talking to her lately. That night, James flatlines, but is mysteriously revived and opens his eyes.

At school, Belle is taunted by her peers over moving into the home, which she learns was the site of a mass murder by Ronald DeFeo Jr. in 1974. In her third-floor bedroom, she discovers blood stains from the murder concealed under the wallpaper.

One night, Belle invites acquaintances Terrence—an enthusiast on the Amityville haunting—and Marissa over to watch The Amityville Horror (1979) at the house. At 3:15am in the middle of the film, the power goes out and the three go into the basement to locate the fuse box, where they are confronted by Joan, who thinks they are intruders.

Dr. Milton, who suspects James may have locked-in syndrome, performs an EEG test on James that shows increased neurological function. During the test, Dr. Milton witnesses an apparition of flies filling the room and attacking him, and leaves the house, shaken.

James quickly gains the ability to communicate with the family via an AAC computer system that allows him to type by looking at letters on a screen. Terrence suggests to Belle that James' sudden revival may be a result of possession stemming from the house, and they suspect that a ring on the ground surrounding the house may represent a magic circle.

Belle explains her troubled past to Marissa and reveals that James sustained his injuries after falling off a three-story balcony during a fight with a boy who had leaked nude pictures of Belle online.

Belle asks James if someone else is inhabiting his body, to which he replies "Yes" and "Help" via his computer. He asks her to kill him, and she shuts off his ventilation machine. Joan enters the room and finds that James is now breathing on his own.

The next day, Belle types “Outside walk” on James’ computer in order to distract her mother and find the Red Room in the basement, which she believes to be the source of James’ power. Larry the dog is found mauled to death in the lake by Juliet, and Belle confronts her mother with the theory that the house is possessing James.

Joan reveals to her that after having lost her faith in God following the death of her husband and James’ subsequent accident, she moved the family to the home, hoping to harness the demonic energy there in order to bring James back to life.

That night, as Belle prepares to leave, Joan knocks her unconscious. Belle awakens at 3:15am, just as her aunt Candice arrives at the house. James rises from his bed, and harnesses the energy from the Red Room, which revitalizes his body. Belle makes her way downstairs as Candice enters the house, but James shoots Candice with a shotgun. Belle retrieves Juliet from her room, but the house locks the doors, preventing them from escaping.

Joan is confronted by James in her bedroom and knowing she is facing death, she retrieves her crucifix, and holds it toward James, but he is unaffected. He reminds her that with the loss of her faith, God is not able to save her. James shoots Joan in the chest before throwing her on her bed and shooting her in the head.

He lures Juliet to the third floor, where he attempts to kill her, but is stopped by Belle, who tackles him, resulting in them both falling from the window. Belle lands on top of James which incapacitates him. She drags James outside the circle, after which his body withers back to its paralyzed form, and he dies after thanking her for freeing him from the possession.

A newsreel epilogue reveals that Belle is being questioned for the murders of her mother, aunt, and brother. However, Juliet corroborates Belle’s story that James was the murderer. James' fingerprints were discovered on the murder weapon, but Dr. Milton refutes the claim due to James’ paralysis. The news report comments on yet another tragedy occurring in the Amityville house.

Cast
 Bella Thorne as Belle Walker
 Cameron Monaghan as James Walker
 Jennifer Jason Leigh as Joan Walker
 Mckenna Grace as Juliet Walker
 Thomas Mann as Terrence
 Taylor Spreitler as Marissa
 Jennifer Morrison as Candice
 Kurtwood Smith as Dr. Ken Milton
 Robin Atkin Downes as Narrator (voice)

Production

Development
The film was initially conceived as a separate film entitled Amityville: The Lost Tapes. Dimension Films and Blumhouse Productions were to co-produce the film together, with a screenplay by Casey La Scala and Daniel Farrands. It was to be a found-footage film in the style of La Scala and Blumhouse's highly successful Paranormal Activity films. The plot involved "an ambitious female television news intern, on the verge of breaking the most famous haunted house case in the world, who leads a team of journalists, clergymen and paranormal researchers into an investigation of the bizarre events that will come to be known as The Amityville Horror, only to unwittingly open a door to the unreal that she may never be able to close."

Franck Khalfoun was set to write and direct the film, and filming was to begin in the summer and be released by January 27, 2012.
In a press release, Bob Weinstein stated, "We are thrilled to return to the mythology of the Amityville Horror with a new and terrifying vision that will satisfy our existing fans and also introduce an entirely new audience to this popular haunting phenomenon." After several delays, the film was rewritten with a completely new story and screenplay by Khalfoun. In March 2014, this new iteration was retitled Amityville.

Casting
That month, Jennifer Jason Leigh and Bella Thorne signed on to star. In April, Thomas Mann, Taylor Spreitler and Cameron Monaghan signed on to the film.

Filming
Principal photography began April 1, 2014 and concluded May 9 that year in Long Beach. A full house set was built for production in El Dorado Park. Further delays, including February 2016 reshoots, pushed the film's release to late 2016, and then early 2017.

Release
The film was originally scheduled for release on January 2, 2015. However, in September 2014, it was removed from the schedule. In May 2015, it was announced the film would be released on April 15, 2016. When Filmyard Holdings sold Miramax to beIN Media Group on March 2, 2016, Miramax was no longer the production company of Amityville: The Awakening. It was set to be released on April 1, 2016, but was delayed due to test screening responses and given the release date of January 6, 2017. On December 16, 2016, just weeks away from the film's January 6 release date, the film was again pushed back, this time to June 30, 2017; it was eventually removed from there as well. In September 2017, it was announced that it would be released in select theaters in the US on October 28, 2017, and for free on Google Play from October 12 to November 8, 2017.

The film was released on DVD, Blu-ray and Digital HD on November 14, 2017.

Box office
Despite the US delays, the film began its theatrical run in Ukraine and Central America on July 20, 2017, where the film grossed $580,466 from 830 screens. The film was released in the Philippines on August 2, 2017.

The film opened in the US on a limited release on October 28, 2017. Playing in 10 theaters the film made just $742 in its opening weekend (an average of $74 per venue), finishing 60th at the box office.

Critical response
On review aggregator Rotten Tomatoes, the film has an approval rating of 30% based on 20 reviews, and an average rating of 3.90/10. On Metacritic, which assigns a normalized rating to reviews, the film has a weighted average score of 42 out of 100, based on 4 critics, indicating "mixed or average reviews".

Witney Siebold of IGN gave the film a score of 5.5/10, writing that the film, "while largely a generic haunting film without much in the way of a hook beyond its famous setting, can at least claim to be one of the more watchable Amityville films, for whatever that praise may be worth," and deemed it "perhaps the best Amityville film since 1983." Dread Central gave the film two and a half stars out of five saying "At the end of the day, this isn't such a bad flick, but viewers looking for an insane new Amityville experience will just have to keep chasing that dragon." Slant Magazine gave the film two out of four stars and called it "an elegant entry in a lame series of horror films."

Home media
The film was released on Blu-ray, DVD, and on demand on November 14, 2017, but was not released in the U.K.

References

External links
 
 

2017 drama films
2017 films
2017 horror films
2010s English-language films
2010s high school films
2010s horror drama films
2010s psychological drama films
2010s psychological horror films
2010s supernatural horror films
2010s teen drama films
2010s teen horror films
Alternative sequel films
American body horror films
American haunted house films
American high school films
American horror drama films
American psychological drama films
American psychological horror films
American supernatural drama films
American supernatural horror films
American teen drama films
American teen horror films
Amityville Horror films
Blumhouse Productions films
Demons in film
Dimension Films films
Fiction about familicide
Films about child abuse
Films about animal cruelty
Films about dysfunctional families
Films about euthanasia
Films about fratricide and sororicide
Films about mass murder
Films about nightmares
Films about paraplegics or quadriplegics
Films about single parent families
Films about spirit possession
Twins in American films
Films about widowhood
Films directed by Franck Khalfoun
Films produced by Jason Blum
Films scored by Robin Coudert
Films set in 1974
Films set in 2014
Films set in Long Island
Films shot in Los Angeles County, California
Horror films based on actual events
Matricide in fiction
Self-reflexive films
Works about neurology
2010s American films